The Luddites were a secret oath-based organisation of English textile workers in the 19th century who formed a radical faction which destroyed textile machinery. The group is believed to have taken its name from Ned Ludd, a legendary weaver supposedly from Anstey, near Leicester. They protested against manufacturers who used machines in what they called "a fraudulent and deceitful manner" to get around standard labour practices. Luddites feared that the time spent learning the skills of their craft would go to waste, as machines would replace their role in the industry.

Many Luddites were owners of workshops that had closed because factories could sell similar products for less. But when workshop owners set out to find a job at a factory, it was very hard to find one because producing things in factories required fewer workers than producing those same things in a workshop. This left many people unemployed and angry.

The Luddite movement began in Nottingham in England and culminated in a region-wide rebellion that lasted from 1811 to 1816. Mill and factory owners took to shooting protesters and eventually the movement was suppressed with legal and military force, which included execution and penal transportation of accused and convicted Luddites.

Over time, the term has come to mean one opposed to industrialisation, automation, computerisation, or new technologies in general.

Etymology 
The name Luddite is of uncertain origin. The movement was said to be named after Ned Ludd, an apprentice who allegedly smashed two stocking frames in 1779 and whose name had become emblematic of machine destroyers. Ned Ludd, however, was probably completely fictional and used as a way to shock and provoke the government. The name developed into the imaginary General Ludd or King Ludd, who was reputed to live in Sherwood Forest like Robin Hood.

'Lud' or 'Ludd', according to Geoffrey of Monmouth's legendary History of the Kings of Britain and other medieval Welsh texts, was a Celtic King of 'The Islands of Britain' in pre-Roman times, who supposedly founded London and was buried at Ludgate. In the Welsh versions of Geoffrey's Historia, usually called Brut y Brenhinedd, he is called Lludd fab Beli, establishing the connection to the early mythological Lludd Llaw Eraint.

Historical precedents 
In 1779, Ned Ludd, a weaver from Anstey, near Leicester, England, is supposed to have broken two stocking frames in a fit of rage. When the "Luddites" emerged in the 1810s, his identity was appropriated to become the folkloric character of Captain Ludd, also known as King Ludd or General Ludd, the Luddites' alleged leader and founder.

The lower classes of the 18th century were not openly disloyal to the king or government, generally speaking, and violent action was rare because punishments were harsh. The majority of individuals were primarily concerned with meeting their own daily needs. Working conditions were harsh in the English textile mills at the time, but efficient enough to threaten the livelihoods of skilled artisans. The new inventions produced textiles faster and cheaper because they were operated by less-skilled, low-wage labourers, and the Luddite goal was to gain a better bargaining position with their employers.

Kevin Binfield asserts that organized action by stockingers had occurred at various times since 1675, and he suggests that the movements of the early 19th century should be viewed in the context of the hardships suffered by the working class during the Napoleonic Wars, rather than as an absolute aversion to machinery. Irregular rises in food prices provoked the Keelmen to riot in the port of Tyne in 1710 and tin miners to steal from granaries at Falmouth in 1727. There was a rebellion in Northumberland and Durham in 1740, and an assault on Quaker corn dealers in 1756. Skilled artisans in the cloth, building, shipbuilding, printing, and cutlery trades organized friendly societies to peacefully insure themselves against unemployment, sickness, and intrusion of foreign labour into their trades, as was common among guilds.

Malcolm L. Thomis argued in his 1970 history The Luddites that machine-breaking was one of a very few tactics that workers could use to increase pressure on employers, to undermine lower-paid competing workers, and to create solidarity among workers. "These attacks on machines did not imply any necessary hostility to machinery as such; machinery was just a conveniently exposed target against which an attack could be made." An agricultural variant of Luddism occurred during the widespread Swing Riots of 1830 in southern and eastern England, centering on breaking threshing machines.

Birth of the movement 
See also Barthélemy Thimonnier, whose sewing machines were destroyed by tailors who believed that their jobs were threatened

Handloom weavers burned mills and pieces of factory machinery. Textile workers destroyed industrial equipment during the late 18th century, prompting acts such as the Protection of Stocking Frames, etc. Act 1788.

The Luddite movement emerged during the harsh economic climate of the Napoleonic Wars, which saw a rise of difficult working conditions in the new textile factories. Luddites objected primarily to the rising popularity of automated textile equipment, threatening the jobs and livelihoods of skilled workers as this technology allowed them to be replaced by cheaper and less skilled workers.  The movement began in Arnold, Nottingham, on 11 March 1811 and spread rapidly throughout England over the following two years. The British economy suffered greatly in 1810 to 1812, especially in terms of high unemployment and inflation. The causes included the high cost of the wars with Napoleon, Napoleon's Continental System of economic warfare, and escalating conflict with the United States. The crisis led to widespread protest and violence, but the middle classes and upper classes strongly supported the government, which used the army to suppress all working class unrest, especially the Luddite movement.

The Luddites met at night on the moors surrounding industrial towns to practice military-like drills and manoeuvres. Their main areas of operation began in Nottinghamshire in November 1811, followed by the West Riding of Yorkshire in early 1812, and then Lancashire by March 1813. They smashed stocking frames and cropping frames among other things. There does not seem to have been any political motivation behind the Luddite riots and there was no national organization; the men were merely attacking what they saw as the reason for the decline in their livelihoods. Luddites clashed with government troops at Burton's Mill in Middleton and at Westhoughton Mill, both in Lancashire. The Luddites and their supporters anonymously sent death threats to, and possibly attacked, magistrates and food merchants. Activists smashed Heathcote's lacemaking machine in Loughborough in 1816. He and other industrialists had secret chambers constructed in their buildings that could be used as hiding places during an attack.

In 1817, an unemployed Nottingham stockinger and probably ex-Luddite, named Jeremiah Brandreth led the Pentrich Rising. While this was a general uprising unrelated to machinery, it can be viewed as the last major Luddite act.

Government response 

The British government ultimately dispatched 12,000 troops to suppress Luddite activity, which as historian Eric Hobsbawm noted was a larger number than the army which the Duke of Wellington led during the Peninsular War. Four Luddites, led by a man named George Mellor, ambushed and assassinated mill owner William Horsfall of Ottiwells Mill in Marsden, West Yorkshire, at Crosland Moor in Huddersfield. Horsfall had remarked that he would "Ride up to his saddle in Luddite blood". Mellor fired the fatal shot to Horsfall's groin, and all four men were arrested.  One of the men, Benjamin Walker, turned informant, and the other three were hanged. Lord Byron denounced what he considered to be the plight of the working class, the government's inane policies and ruthless repression in the House of Lords on 27 February 1812: "I have been in some of the most oppressed provinces of Turkey; but never, under the most despotic of infidel governments, did I behold such squalid wretchedness as I have seen since my return, in the very heart of a Christian country". 

Government officials sought to suppress the Luddite movement with a mass trial at York in January 1813, following the attack on Cartwrights Mill at Rawfolds near Cleckheaton. The government charged over 60 men, including Mellor and his companions, with various crimes in connection with Luddite activities. While some of those charged were actual Luddites, many had no connection to the movement. Although the proceedings were legitimate jury trials, many were abandoned due to lack of evidence and 30 men were acquitted. These trials were certainly intended to act as show trials to deter other Luddites from continuing their activities. The harsh sentences of those found guilty, which included execution and penal transportation, quickly ended the movement. Parliament made "machine breaking" (i.e. industrial sabotage) a capital crime with the Frame Breaking Act of 1812. Lord Byron opposed this legislation, becoming one of the few prominent defenders of the Luddites after the treatment of the defendants at the York trials.

Legacy 

In the 19th century, occupations that arose from the growth of trade and shipping in ports, also in "domestic" manufacturers, were notorious for precarious employment prospects. Underemployment was chronic during this period, and it was common practice to retain a larger workforce than was typically necessary for insurance against labour shortages in boom times.

Moreover, the organization of manufacture by merchant-capitalists in the textile industry was inherently unstable. While the financiers' capital was still largely invested in raw material, it was easy to increase commitment where trade was good and almost as easy to cut back when times were bad. Merchant-capitalists lacked the incentive of later factory owners, whose capital was invested in building and plants, to maintain a steady rate of production and return on fixed capital. The combination of seasonal variations in wage rates and violent short-term fluctuations springing from harvests and war produced periodic outbreaks of violence.

Modern usage 
Nowadays, the term "Luddite" often is used to describe someone who is opposed or resistant to new technologies.

In 1956, during a British Parliamentary debate, a Labour spokesman said that "organised workers were by no means wedded to a 'Luddite Philosophy'." By 2006, the term neo-Luddism had emerged to describe opposition to many forms of technology. According to a manifesto drawn up by the Second Luddite Congress (April 1996; Barnesville, Ohio), neo-Luddism is "a leaderless movement of passive resistance to consumerism and the increasingly bizarre and frightening technologies of the Computer Age".

The term "Luddite fallacy" is used by economists in reference to the fear that technological unemployment inevitably generates structural unemployment and is consequently macroeconomically injurious. If a technological innovation results in a reduction of necessary labour inputs in a given sector, then the industry-wide cost of production falls, which lowers the competitive price and increases the equilibrium supply point that, theoretically, will require an increase in aggregate labour inputs. During the 20th century and the first decade of the 21st century, the dominant view among economists has been that belief in long-term technological unemployment was indeed a fallacy. More recently, there has been increased support for the view that the benefits of automation are not equally distributed.

See also 
 Development criticism
 Ted Kaczynski
 Ruddington Framework Knitters' Museum – features a Luddite gallery
 Simple living
 Technophobia
 Turner Controversy – return to pre-industrial methods of production

Explanatory notes

References

Sources

Further reading 

 Anderson, Gary M., and Robert D. Tollison. "Luddism as cartel enforcement." Journal of Institutional and Theoretical Economics (JITE)/Zeitschrift für die gesamte Staatswissenschaft 142.4 (1986): 727–738.  .
 
 
 Darvall, F. Popular Disturbances and Public Order in Regency England (Oxford University Press, 1934)
 Dinwiddy, John. "Luddism and politics in the northern counties." Social History 4.1 (1979): 33–63.
 
 
 Haywood, Ian. "Unruly People: The Spectacular Riot." in Bloody Romanticism (Palgrave Macmillan, London, 2006) pp. 181–222.
 
 Horn, Jeff. "Machine-Breaking and the 'Threat from Below' in Great Britain and France during the Early Industrial Revolution." in Crowd actions in Britain and France from the middle ages to the modern world (Palgrave Macmillan, London, 2015) pp. 165–178.
 
 Linebaugh, Peter. Ned Ludd & Queen Mab: machine-breaking, romanticism, and the several commons of 1811-12 (PM Press, 2012).
  Linton, David. "The Luddites: How did they get that bad reputation?" Labor History 33.4 (1992): 529–537. .
 
 Munger, Frank. "Suppression of Popular Gatherings in England, 1800–1830". American Journal of Legal History 25 (1981): 111+.
 Navickas, Katrina. "The search for 'general Ludd': The mythology of Luddism." Social History 30.3 (2005): 281–295.
 O’Rourke, Kevin Hjortshøj, Ahmed S. Rahman, and Alan M. Taylor. "Luddites, the industrial revolution, and the demographic transition." Journal of Economic Growth 18.4 (2013): 373–409. .
 Pallas, Stephen J. The Hell that Bigots Frame': Queen Mab, Luddism, and the Rhetoric of Working-Class Revolution". Journal for the Study of Radicalism 12.2 (2018): 55–80. . .
 Patterson, A. Temple. "Luddism, Hampden Clubs, and Trade Unions in Leicestershire, 1816–17." English Historical Review 63.247 (1948): 170–188. online
 Poitras, Geoffrey. "The Luddite trials: Radical suppression and the administration of criminal justice". Journal for the Study of Radicalism 14.1 (2020): 121–166.
 
 
 
 
 Stöllinger, Roman. "The Luddite rebellion: Past and present". wiiw Monthly Report 11 (2018): 6–11.
 Thomis, Malcolm I. The Luddites: Machine-Breaking in Regency England (Archon Books. 1970).
 Thompson, E. P. (1968). The Making of the English Working Class.
 Wasserstrom, Jeffrey. Civilization' and Its Discontents: The Boxers and Luddites as Heroes and Villains." Theory and Society (1987): 675–707. .

Primary sources

External links 

 Luddite Bicentenary – Comprehensive chronicle of the Luddite uprisings
 The Luddite Link – Comprehensive historical resources for the original West Yorkshire Luddites, University of Huddersfield
 Luddism and the Neo-Luddite Reaction by Martin Ryder, University of Colorado at Denver School of Education
 The Luddites and the Combination Acts from the Marxists Internet Archive
 The Luddites (1988)—Thames Television drama-documentary about the West Riding Luddites.

History of social movements
Criticism of science
Industrial Revolution
19th century in the United Kingdom
Political slurs for people
History of the textile industry in the United Kingdom
Political movements in England
Agrarian politics
Anarcho-primitivism
1812 in economics
Technophobia
Lifestyles
Eponymous political ideologies